Clay Township is one of fourteen townships in Carroll County, Indiana. As of the 2010 census, its population was 1,255 and it contained 463 housing units. Clay Township is part of the Rossville, Indiana school district.

History
Clay Township was organized in 1831.

Geography
The North Fork and Middle Fork of the Wildcat Creek both pass through Clay Township. The Lancaster Bridge, an historic covered bridge erected in 1872, spans the North Fork of the Wildcat Creek east of Owasco. The North Fork is an official Indiana State Scenic River.

Unincorporated towns
 Owasco
 Pyrmont

Adjacent townships
 Madison Township (north)
 Democrat Township (east)
 Ross Township, Clinton County (south)
 Perry Township, Tippecanoe County (west)
 Washington Township, Tippecanoe County (northwest)

Major highways
  U.S. Route 421

Cemeteries
The township contains four cemeteries: Beard, Hufford, Hufford, Hughes and St. John's.

References
 
 United States Census Bureau cartographic boundary files

External links

 Indiana Township Association
 United Township Association of Indiana

Townships in Carroll County, Indiana
Lafayette metropolitan area, Indiana
Townships in Indiana
1831 establishments in Indiana